Historically Speaking may refer to:

 Historically Speaking (Gerry Mulligan album), 1951
 Historically Speaking (Duke Ellington album), 1956
 Historically Speaking (journal), an academic journal and official bulletin of The Historical Society in Boston, Massachusetts